Lewis Arthur Trevor James Galbraith Pooler (29 January 1858 – 15 June 1924) was an Anglican priest in Ireland during the 20th century.

The son of James Galbraith Pooler  he was educated at The Royal School, Armagh and Trinity College, Dublin where he was a Double First Prizeman. After a teaching post at his old school he was ordained deacon in 1882 and priest in 1883. His first post was a curacy at St James' Church, Belfast. He was Rector of Hollymount from 1899 to 1912; and Archdeacon of Down from 1912 until his death. He was also an Honorary Canon of St Patricks Cathedral, Dublin; an Examining Chaplain to successive Bishops of Down, Connor and Dromore; Rural Dean of Lecale East;  a Member of the Representative Church Body of the Church of Ireland; and Honorary Secretary of its General Synod.

Notes

Books by Pooler
History of the Church of Ireland, 2nd edn, 1902
Studies in the Religion of Israel, 1904
Eschatology of the Psalms, 1904
St Patrick in Co. Down, a Reply to Professor Zimmer, 1904
Down and its Parish Church, 1907
Social Questions, 1910
Urgent Social Problems, 1912

People educated at The Royal School, Armagh
19th-century Irish Anglican priests
20th-century Irish Anglican priests
1924 deaths
1858 births
Archdeacons of Down
Alumni of Trinity College Dublin